AD 28 (XXVIII) was a leap year starting on Thursday (link will display the full calendar) of the Julian calendar. At the time, it was known as the Year of the Consulship of Silanus and Nerva (or, less frequently, year 781 Ab urbe condita). The denomination AD 28 for this year has been used since the early medieval period, when the Anno Domini calendar era became the prevalent method in Europe for naming years.

Events

By place

Germania 
 Roman legions in Germania are transported by fleet to the fortress of Flevum on the Rhine, to operate against the rebellious Frisians.
 The Frisians negotiate a treaty with the Roman Empire at the River Rhine, avoiding conquest.

Korea 
 King Daru of Baekje succeeds to the throne of Baekje in the Korean peninsula.

Judea 
 According to the Gospel of Luke (Luke 3:1-2), the ministries of John the Baptist and Jesus begin at the earliest in this year, and more likely in AD 29.

Births 
 June 15 – Ming of Han, Chinese emperor (d. AD 75)
 Julia Berenice, Jewish client queen of Judea
 Silius Italicus, Roman consul and epic poet

Deaths 
 Onjo of Baekje, Korean king

References 

0028

als:20er#28